is a Japanese politician of the Liberal Democratic Party, a member of the House of Representatives in the Diet of Japan.

Career 
A native of Tokyo, who attended secondary schools in the NY area, and graduate of Seikei University, he was elected to the House of Representatives for the first time in 1990.

Affiliated to the openly revisionist lobby Nippon Kaigi, Furuya is also a member of the following groups at the Diet: Japan (Vice Chair), Textbooks, Shinto, Yasukuni, Fundamental Education Law Reform (Committee Chair), Nikkyoso, Constitutional Revision, Japan Rebirth (Delegate Chair), China Memorial Photographs Protest (Vice Chair), Proper Japan, Protest American Comfort Women Resolution, North Korea Kidnap Victims (Secretary General).

He is the head of the Japan-ROC Diet Members' Consultative Council.

Political career 
Furuya has held the following posts:

April 1984:
Secretary to Minister for Foreign Affairs Shintaro ABE

November 1984:
Secretary to Minister of Home Affairs Toru Furuya

February 1990:
Won a House of Representatives seat at the 39th general election (first term)

July 1993:
Re-elected to the House of Representatives at the 40th general election (second term)

March 1995:
Director, Youth Division, Liberal Democratic Party

1995:
Vice-Minister of Justice

January 1996:
Director, Youth Division, Liberal Democratic Party

October 1996:
Re-elected to the House of Representatives at the 41st general election (third term)

November 1996:
Director, Posts and Telecommunication Division, Policy Research Council, Liberal Democratic Party

October 1997:
Senior member of Posts and Telecommunication Committee, House of Representatives

September 1998:
Deputy Chairman, Diet Affairs Committee, Liberal Democratic Party

October 1999:
Member of the House Steering Committee, House of Representatives

June 2000:
Re-elected to the House of Representatives at the 42nd general election (fourth term)

July 2000:
Chairman, Commerce and Industry Committee, House of Representatives

December 2000:
Deputy Chairman (Manager), Policy Research Council, Liberal Democratic Party

May 2001:
Senior Vice Minister of Economy, Trade and Industry

October 2002:
Chairman, Committee of Education, Culture, Sports, Science and Technology, House of Representatives

November 2003:
Re-elected to the House of Representatives at the 43rd general election (fifth term)
Deputy Secretary-General, Liberal Democratic Party

October 2004:
Acting Chairman, Headquarters for Party and Political System Reform Implementation, Liberal Democratic Party

September 2005:
Re-elected to the House of Representatives at the 44th general election (sixth term)

October 2007:
Deputy Chairman (Manager), Policy Research Council, Liberal Democratic Party

August 2008:
Director, Interest Group Policy Division, Liberal Democratic Party

September 2008:
Chairman, Public Relations Headquarters, Liberal Democratic Party

August 2009:
Re-elected to the House of Representatives at the 45th general election (seventh term)

October 2009:
President, Central Institute of Politics, Liberal Democratic Party

October 2012:
Chairman, Headquarters for Party and Political System Reform Implementation, Liberal Democratic Party

December 2012:
Chairman of the National Public Safety Commission
Minister in charge of the Abduction Issue
Minister in charge of Building National Resilience
Minister of State for Disaster Management (2nd Abe cabinet)
Re-elected to the House of Representatives at the 46th general election (eighth term)

References

External links 
  
 

Members of the House of Representatives (Japan)
North Korean abductions of Japanese citizens
Politicians from Tokyo
1952 births
Members of Nippon Kaigi
Seikei University alumni
Living people
Liberal Democratic Party (Japan) politicians
21st-century Japanese politicians